is a Japanese footballer who playing as a goalkeeper and currently play for Okinawa SV.

Career
On 24 February 2023, Narahashi was announcement officially transfer to JFL promoted club, Okinawa SV for ahead of 2023 season.

Personal life
Takuma Narahashi is son of former Japanese footballer, Akira Narahashi.

Career statistics

Club
.

Notes

References

External links

1997 births
Living people
Association football people from Ibaraki Prefecture
Hannan University alumni
Japanese footballers
Association football goalkeepers
J3 League players
Japan Football League players
Kawasaki Frontale players
Fujieda MYFC players
Okinawa SV players